Zach Sterup (born May 14, 1992) is a former American football offensive tackle. He played college football at Nebraska.

Professional career

Kansas City Chiefs
Sterup signed with the Kansas City Chiefs as an undrafted free agent on May 10, 2016. He was waived by the Chiefs on September 3, 2016. He was re-signed to the practice squad on November 2, 2016, but was released six days later.

New York Jets
On November 9, 2016, Sterup was signed to the New York Jets' practice squad. He was released on November 29, 2016.

Cleveland Browns
On December 5, 2016, Sterup was signed to the Cleveland Browns' practice squad. He signed a reserve/future contract with the Browns on January 2, 2017.

On September 7, 2017, Sterup was waived by the Browns and was re-signed to the practice squad.

Miami Dolphins
On November 8, 2017, Sterup was signed by the Miami Dolphins off the Browns' practice squad.

On September 1, 2019, Sterup was waived by the Dolphins and re-signed to the practice squad. He was released on September 10.

References

External links
Nebraska Cornhuskers bio

1992 births
Living people
American football offensive tackles
Nebraska Cornhuskers football players
Kansas City Chiefs players
New York Jets players
Cleveland Browns players
Miami Dolphins players
Players of American football from Nebraska
People from Hastings, Nebraska